Thaddeus Stevens School of Observation is a historic school building located in the Poplar neighborhood of Philadelphia, Pennsylvania.  It was designed by Irwin T. Catharine and built in 1926–1927.  It is a five-story, brick building on a limestone base and grade-level basement in the Late Gothic Revival-style. It features a projecting entrance bay with Gothic arch opening, round arched openings, and decorative spandrel panels. It was used as an "observation school" for teacher education and training.  It is named for Congressman Thaddeus Stevens (1792–1868).

The building was added to the National Register of Historic Places in 1988. The school has since closed and been turned into lofts. 

In 1998 Philadelphia based mural artist Meg Saligman painted the iconic mural "Common Threads," wherein she depicts a humanity shared across time, today's youth paralleled with classical figures. All models for the mural were local high school students.

References

External links
Mural Lofts

School buildings on the National Register of Historic Places in Philadelphia
Gothic Revival architecture in Pennsylvania
School buildings completed in 1927
Poplar, Philadelphia
Apartment buildings in Pennsylvania
Defunct schools in Pennsylvania
1927 establishments in Pennsylvania